Camilla Spelta (born 6 April 1988 in Milan) is an Italian former ice dancer. Early in her career, she competed with Alessandro Soresina and Luca Lanotte. She then teamed up with Marco Garavaglia, with whom she placed 14th at the 2006 World Junior Championships and won two silver medals on the ISU Junior Grand Prix circuit. Their partnership ended in 2007.

Programs

With Garavaglia

With Lanotte

Competitive highlights

With Garavaglia

With Lanotte

References

External links 
 
 

1988 births
Living people
Italian female ice dancers
Figure skaters from Milan
20th-century Italian women
21st-century Italian women